Trudolyubiye is a rural locality (a selo) in Svetloyarsky District, Volgograd Oblast, Russia. The population was 85 as of 2010. There are 7 streets.

Geography 
Trudolyubiye is located 33 km south of Svetly Yar (the district's administrative centre) by road. Khonch Nur is the nearest rural locality.

References 

Rural localities in Svetloyarsky District